Boston Blackie is a fictional character created by author Jack Boyle (1881–1928). Blackie, a jewel thief and safecracker in Boyle's stories, became a detective in adaptations for films, radio and television—an "enemy to those who make him an enemy, friend to those who have no friend."

Actor Chester Morris played the character in 14 Columbia Pictures films (1941–1949) and in a 1944 NBC radio series.

Literature
Writer Jack Boyle grew up in Chicago, Illinois. While working as a newspaper reporter in San Francisco, he became an opium addict, was drawn into crime, and was jailed for writing bad checks. Later convicted of robbery, Boyle was serving a term in San Quentin when he created the character of Boston Blackie. The first four stories appeared in The American Magazine in 1914, with Boyle writing under the pen name "No. 6066". From 1917 to 1919, Boston Blackie stories appeared in The Red Book magazine, and from 1918 they were adapted for motion pictures.

When Boston Blackie began to find success on the screen, Boyle edited the Red Book magazine stories into a book, Boston Blackie (1919). He revised and rearranged the order of the stories to create a cohesive narrative—a common practice at the time known in publishing as a fixup. This was the only appearance of Boston Blackie in book form, but his adventures continued to appear in periodicals.

Short stories

Films

The earliest Boston Blackie film adaptations were silent, dating from 1918 to 1927. Columbia Pictures revived the property in 1941 with Meet Boston Blackie, a fast, 58-minute B movie starring Chester Morris. Although the running time was brief, Columbia gave the picture good production values and an imaginative director, Robert Florey. The film was successful, and a series followed.

In the Columbia features, Boston Blackie is a reformed jewel thief who is always suspected when a daring crime is committed. In order to clear himself, he investigates personally and brings the actual culprit to justice, sometimes using disguises. An undercurrent of comedy runs throughout the action/detective series.

In one of these films, After Midnight with Boston Blackie, the character's real name was revealed to be Horatio Black.

Morris gave the Blackie character his own personal charm: he could be light and flippant or stern and dangerous, as the situation demanded. His sidekick, the Runt, was always on hand to help his old friend. George E. Stone played Runt in all but the first and last films. Charles Wagenheim and Sid Tomack, respectively, substituted for Stone when he was not available.

Blackie's friendly adversaries were Inspector Farraday of the police (played in all the films and the radio series by Richard Lane) and his assistant, Sergeant Matthews. Matthews was originally played as a hapless victim of circumstance by Walter Sande; he was replaced by Lyle Latell, who played it dumber, and then by comedian Frank Sully, who played it even dumber.

Blackie and Runt were often assisted in their endeavors by their friends: the cheerful but easily flustered millionaire Arthur Manleder (almost always played by Lloyd Corrigan; Harry Hayden and Harrison Greene each played the role once), and the streetwise pawnbroker Jumbo Madigan (played by Cy Kendall or Joseph Crehan). A variety of actresses including Rochelle Hudson, Harriet Hilliard, Adele Mara and Ann Savage took turns playing various gal Friday characters.

The films are highly typical of Columbia's B movies of the 1940s, with an assortment of veteran character actors (including Clarence Muse, Marvin Miller, George Lloyd, Byron Foulger), new faces on the way up (Larry Parks, Dorothy Malone, Nina Foch, Forrest Tucker, Lloyd Bridges) and stock-company players familiar from Columbia's features, serials, and short subjects (Kenneth MacDonald, George McKay, Eddie Laughton, John Tyrrell). The series was also a useful training ground for promising directors, including Edward Dmytryk, Oscar Boetticher, William Castle, and finally Seymour Friedman, who went on to work prolifically in Columbia's television department. The Boston Blackie series ran until 1949.

Filmography

Radio

Concurrent with the Columbia Pictures films, a Boston Blackie radio series—also starring Chester Morris—aired on NBC June 23 – September 15, 1944, as a summer replacement for Amos 'n' Andy. Lesley Woods played Blackie's girlfriend Mary Wesley; Richard Lane played Inspector Farraday. Harlow Wilcox was the announcer for the 30-minute program.

A new incarnation of the Boston Blackie radio series aired April 11, 1945 – October 25, 1950, starring Richard Kollmar. Maurice Tarplin played Inspector Farraday; Jan Miner was Mary. More than 200 half-hour episodes were transcribed and syndicated by Frederick Ziv to Mutual and other network outlets.

Television

Kent Taylor starred in the Ziv-produced half-hour TV series The Adventures of Boston Blackie. Syndicated in September 1951, it ran for 58 episodes, lasting until 1953, continuing in repeats over the following decade. Lois Collier appeared as Mary Wesley and Frank Orth was Inspector Farraday. The series was set in Los Angeles; Mary and Blackie had a dog named Whitie, and comedy sometimes took precedence over crime.

Television historian Tim Brooks in The Complete Directory to Prime Time Network and Cable TV Shows 1946–Present described Boston Blackie as "a memorable B-grade television series … The term 'B' is used in all the best senses: a certain vitality and sense of humor substituted more than adequately for the normal criteria of expensive production and famous stars."

Graphic novels
Scripter Stefan Petrucha and artist Kirk Van Wormer created the graphic novel Boston Blackie (Moonstone Books, 2002) with a cover by Tim Seelig. A jewel heist at a costume ball goes horribly wrong, and the five-year-old son of the wealthy Greene family disappears and is presumed dead; the body is never found. The main suspect is Boston Blackie, who is still haunted seven years later by what happened that night. Drawn back into the case, he finds that the truth of what happened that night is awash in a watery grave. A sequel to the graphic novel was published years later.

In popular culture

 In the 1955 film Tight Spot, Ginger Rogers exclaims "Well, aren't we the real life-size Boston Blackies."
A 1957 Daffy Duck cartoon, Boston Quackie, is a direct parody of the television serial, with Daffy as the detective – who needs everyone else's help to solve his case.
 Jimmy Buffett's song "Pencil Thin Mustache" references Boston Blackie, as does  The Coasters' song "Searchin'" and some versions of "The Wabash Cannonball".
 Boston Blackie's Restaurant was a bar and grill with locations in Chicago and Deerfield, Illinois.
 In a 1967 episode of Bewitched ("Samantha's Thanksgiving to Remember", Season 4, Episode 12), "Boston Blackie" is mentioned in fond remembrance by Aunt Clara (Marion Lorne), who confuses him as attending the First Thanksgiving with famous Pilgrims.
 In Errol Morris' 1988 documentary The Thin Blue Line, interviewee Emily Miller cites Boston Blackie as an inspiration for wanting to become a "detective, or the wife of a detective." The film's score by Philip Glass also has a cue titled "Boston Blackie."
 In Chuck E. Weiss's 2014 release, Red Beans and Weiss, track 3 is entitled "Boston Blackie" and comprises four verses, sandwiching three repetitions of the chorus; the chorus lyrics include "I'm just like Boston Blackie, yes I am", and, derived from the original stories, "Friends to those who have no friends".
In a 2007 television episode of Mad Men, when talking about John F. Kennedy as a potential opponent for 1960 presidential candidate Richard M. Nixon, character Bert Cooper says, "It's going to be Kennedy. 'Boston Blackie' won West Virginia."

References
Informational notes

Citations

Bibliography
Pitts, Michael R. Famous Movie Detectives. Scarecrow Press, 1979. .
Judge, Dick. "Chronological listing": Boston Blackie

External links

"Boston Blackie"
Jerry Haendiges Vintage Radio Logs: Boston Blackie

Thrilling Detective
 

Radio shows

Zoot Radio, free 'Boston Blackie' old time radio show downloads, over 390 episodes.

Literary characters introduced in 1914
Film series introduced in 1918
Blackie, Boston
American radio dramas
1944 radio programme debuts
1944 radio programme endings
1940s American radio programs
NBC radio programs
Detective radio shows
Radio programmes based on novels
American film series
Television series by MGM Television
Ziv Company radio programs
Syndicated radio programs